The 2010–11 snooker season was a series of snooker tournaments played between 20 May 2010 and 2 May 2011. The German Masters was the first ranking tournament in Germany since the 1997/1998 season. The Grand Prix was renamed to World Open, and the format of the tournament was change with 32 amateurs joining the Main Tour professionals. The Players Tour Championship minor-ranking series was introduced to the calendar. These events were open to amateurs and professional with a separate Order of Merit. The top 24 in the Order of Merit qualified to the Finals, which was a ranking event. The Premier League was for the first time part of the Main Tour. The Jiangsu Classic was renamed to the Wuxi Classic, and other events were introduced to the calendar: the new cue sport Power Snooker, the World Seniors Championship, and Snooker Shoot Out. The Scottish Professional Championship was held for the first time since 1989.

At the end of the season John Higgins was named the World Snooker Player of the Year and the Snooker Writers Player of the Year, Judd Trump the Fans Player of the Year, Mark Williams the Players Player of the Year and Jack Lisowski the Rookie of the Year. Judd Trump received the "Performance of the Year" for winning his first ranking event, the China Open and reaching the final of the World Championship. "The Magic Moment" award has gone to Rory McLeod for his "thrilling" win against Tony Drago at the Snooker Shoot-Out. Joe Davis, Fred Davis, John Pulman, Ray Reardon, John Spencer, Alex Higgins, Steve Davis and Stephen Hendry were inducted into the Hall of Fame.

New professional players
Countries
 
 
 
 
 
 
 
 
 

Note: new means in these case, that these players were not on the 2009/2010 professional Main Tour. 

NGB nominations

From PIOS Tour

WPBSA Wildcard

Calendar 
The following table outlines the results and dates for all the ranking and major invitational events.

Official rankings

Seeding revision 1

Seeding revision 2

Seeding revision 3

Seeding revision 4

World ranking points

Points distribution 
2010/2011 Points distribution for world ranking and minor-ranking events

Notes

References

External links
 

2010
Season 2011
Season 2010